The discography of South Korean boy band Pentagon consists of two studio albums, seventeen extended plays and nineteen singles.

Studio albums

Extended plays

Singles

Soundtracks

Collaborations

Other songs

Unofficial original releases
All songs are part of Pentagon's project and credits are adapted from the Korea Music Copyright Association's database, unless otherwise noted.

Music videos

See also
 List of songs recorded by Pentagon
 Pentagon videography
 Jinho discography
 Hui discography
 Hongseok discography
 Yeo One discography
Yuto discography
 Kino discography
 Wooseok discography

Notes

References

Discographies of South Korean artists
Discography
K-pop music group discographies